"No Shows" is a song by American musician and My Chemical Romance frontman Gerard Way. The song was released by Warner Bros. Records on August 18, 2014 as the first single from Way's debut studio album, Hesitant Alien. "No Shows" was released to radio on August 25, 2014.

Music video 
A teaser for the music video was released on August 15, 2014, entitled "Pink Station Zero", was uploaded to Way's official YouTube channel. On August 19, the song's official music video was released and was directed by Jennifer Juniper Stratford. The video depicts Way and his band performing the song on the fictional intergalactic music show, "Pink Station Zero".

Personnel
 Gerard Way – lead vocals, rhythm guitar, bass guitar
 Ian Fowles – lead guitar
 James Dewees – keyboards, backing vocals
 Jarrod Alexander – drums
 Jason Freese – horn

Charts

References

External links
No Shows (Music Video) on YouTube

2014 singles
2014 songs
Gerard Way songs
Warner Records singles
Songs written by Gerard Way